Yeongdeok is a town, or eup in Yeongdeok County, North Gyeongsang Province, South Korea. The township Yeongdeok-myeon was upgraded to the town Yeongdeok-eup in 1979. Yeongdeok County Office is located in Namseok-ri and Yeongdeok Town Office is in Ugok-ri, which are crowded with people.

Communities
Yeongdeok-eup is divided into 17 villages (ri).

References

External links
Official website 

Yeongdeok County
Towns and townships in North Gyeongsang Province